Irish Tiger is the eleventh of the Nuala Anne McGrail series  of mystery novels by Roman Catholic priest and author Father Andrew M. Greeley.

References

External links
 http://www.agreeley.com/

2008 American novels
Nuala Anne McGrail series
Novels by Andrew M. Greeley
Forge Books books